Kamonyi is a district (akarere) in Southern Province, Rwanda. Its capital is Kamonyi, also sometimes known as Gihinga.

Sectors 
Kamonyi district is divided into 12 sectors (imirenge): Gacurabwenge, Karama, Kayenzi, Kayumbu, Mugina, Musambira, Ngamba, Nyamiyaga, Nyarubaka, Rugalika, Rukoma and Runda.

References 
 
 Inzego.doc — Province, District and Sector information from MINALOC, the Rwanda ministry of local government.

Southern Province, Rwanda
Districts of Rwanda